The Del Mar Antique [sic] Show & Sale is the longest-running family owned indoor antiques show in California. As of November 2017, the show was in its 56th year.

History

The show is held at the Del Mar Fairgrounds in the seaside city of Del Mar, California, 20 miles north of San Diego. It was established in 1961 by Joseph and Bettye Grimes, who at one time had shows throughout the Southern California region, known as the Calendar Shows. The Grimes advertised the Del Mar Antique [sic] Show as having everything "from tin to Tiffany". Today, the show, which is open to the public for a fee, is owned and operated by the Grimes' son, Michael.

Show highlights

Typically visiting the shows, where up to 7,000 people attend, are costumed members of the San Diego Costume Guild and Red Hat Society members. Each show is themed. For example, the theme for a 2010 show was "Masquerade: A Venice Carnivale at Del Mar." In 2007, organizer and producer Michael Grimes produced a similar themed show, named the Wild West Expo, which Today's Vintage newspaper described as the "Old West starring alongside traditional antiques."

The Del Mar Antique [sic] Show is the largest indoor antiques show south of San Francisco and attracts over 100 antiques dealers from across the western United States. During the downturn in the economy, the 2009 show had 20 percent fewer exhibitors than usual. But participation over the next two years increased again, surpassing the 2009 number. 

In 2010, Grimes organized The Green Meets Green Expo, also held at the Del Mar Fairgrounds. The San Diego Union-Tribune wrote that the expo was "where old and new converge with an eco-friendly theme."

See also
 Antique Trader

References

External links
 Official site

Antiques shows in the United States
Del Mar, California
Del Mar Racetrack
Annual events in California
Recurring events established in 1961
1961 establishments in California
Tourist attractions in San Diego County, California
Festivals in San Diego
Antiques dealers